Nourane Moluh Hassana Epse Fotsing, also known as Nourane Foster (born December 11, 1987, in Cairo, Egypt) is a Cameroonian entrepreneur and politician. In the 2020 Cameroonian parliamentary election she was elected to the National Assembly as a member of the Cameron voice Party for National Reconciliation (CPRN).
She is the founder of the Nourishka brand and runs the companies Nourishka Hair, Nourishka Cosmétiques and Nourishka Hôtel.

References 

Members of the National Assembly (Cameroon)
1987 births
21st-century Cameroonian women politicians
21st-century Cameroonian politicians
20th-century Cameroonian women
Living people